Hannington is a civil parish in the English county of Hampshire. It is situated between Basingstoke and Newbury, on the North Hampshire Downs in the North Wessex Downs Area of Outstanding Natural Beauty. In the 2001 census it had a population of 332 people, increasing to 493 at the 2011 Census.

History and architecture
At its centre is the village green, on the edge of which is All Saints' Church, some parts of which date from the 11th century. There are also many buildings listed as Grade II of significant local historical and architectural importance.

The village's only Public House, The Vine At Hannington, has views over the Hampshire Downs and is a popular stopping point for hikers following the Wayfarer's Walk. Originally called The Wellington Arms, the pub stands on land that once belonged to the estate of the Duke of Wellington.

Governance
The village of Hannington is part of the civil parish of Hannington, and is part of the Kingsclere ward of Basingstoke and Deane borough council. The borough council is a Non-metropolitan district of Hampshire County Council.

Leisure

The Hannington Silver Band celebrated its 90th anniversary in 2014 and regularly plays at churches, fetes and halls in the area.

The Hannington Wine Society meets the 2nd Thursday of the month in the Function Room of the Vine Public House at 8 pm.   People come from Wine Merchants, Wine Companies, Wine Agencies, etc., to talk about and present their wines for tasting, in a friendly and relaxed atmosphere.

The Hannington Country Fair and Barbecue is held every two years on the village green and surrounding land and attracts visitors from all over the county and beyond.

See also
Hannington transmitting station

References

External links

 The Vine At Hannington
 Hannington Country Fair and Barbecue
 The Transmission Gallery: photographs, coverage maps and information
 Info and pictures of Hannington transmitter, including co-receivable transmitters
 Conservation Area Appraisal: Hannington
 Hampshire Treasures: Volume 2 (Basingstoke and Deane) Pages 149, 151, 156, and 162.
 Stained Glass Windows at All Saints, Hannington, Hampshire
 Hannington Wine Society
 Wayfarer's Walk
 

Hannington
Civil parishes in Basingstoke and Deane